= Top of the Shops =

Croatian music sales chart

TOTS logo

The Top of the Shops or TOTS are the main Croatian music sales charts, issued weekly by the Croatian Phonographic Association HDU (Hrvatska diskografska udruga). The charts are a record of the highest selling albums in various genres in Croatia. TOTS became the official Croatian album chart in January 2006.

== TOTS Charts ==
- TOTS Top 40 Domestic Albums Chart
- TOTS Top 40 Foreign Albums Chart
- TOTS Top 50 Combined Albums Chart

== TOTS certifications ==
A music album qualifies for a platinum certification if it exceeds 15,000 copies and a gold certification for 7,000 copies sold. There are also silver and diamond certifications for selling 3,500 and 30,000 copies respectively.
